Doktor od jezera hrochů  is a Czech comedy film directed by Zdeněk Troška. It was released in 2010.

Cast and characters
 Tereza Bebarová as Zuzana Dobešková
 Eva Holubová as Marie Košvancová
 Jaroslav Šmíd as Dr. Čeněk Dobešek
 Jiří Langmajer as Dr. Karel Pištělák

External links
 

2010 films
2010 comedy films
Czech comedy films
Films directed by Zdeněk Troška